Rambabu Adapa from the Electric Power Research Institute (EPRI), Palo Alto, California was named Fellow of the Institute of Electrical and Electronics Engineers (IEEE) in 2012 for leadership in DC and flexible AC transmission systems.

References 

Fellow Members of the IEEE
Living people
21st-century American engineers
Year of birth missing (living people)
American electrical engineers